The 1982 Berlin Marathon was the 9th running of the annual marathon race held in Berlin, West Germany, held on 26 September. Colombia's Domingo Tibaduiza won the men's race in 2:14:47 hours, while the women's race was won by Britain's Jean Lochhead in 2:47:05. Tibaduiza was the first non-European winner of the race and Lochhead was the first non-German women's winner. Sweden's Bo Lindquist won the men's wheelchair race in a time of 2:03:10. No women entered the wheelchair section. A total of 3448 runners finished the race, comprising 3318 men and 130 women.

Results

Men

Women

References 

 Results. Association of Road Racing Statisticians. Retrieved 2020-06-20.
 Berlin Marathon results archive. Berlin Marathon. Retrieved 2020-06-20.

External links 
 Official website

1982
Berlin Marathon
1980s in West Berlin
Berlin Marathon
Berlin Marathon